KWYY (95.5 FM) is a radio station in Casper, Wyoming, branded as "95.5 My Country" and carrying a country music format. The station is currently owned by Townsquare Media.

History
KWYY started out as KYOD, "Coyote Country, the New 104.7", at 104.7 FM in the mid-1990s as a country music station. It was moved to its current location on the FM dial in the late 1990s, after being sold by Heart Media to Mountain States Broadcasting.  The station was sold to Clear Channel Radio in 1999.  Clear Channel sold its Casper stations to GapWest Broadcasting in 2007.  GapWest was folded into Townsquare Media on August 13, 2010.

KWYY was recently re-branded as "My Country 955" and is using local DJs, rather than the satellite programming it used previously.

Programming

On-air DJs include Trisha Berry, Scott LeTourneau, and Rodeo Rick.

Each day at noon, the station plays the Star Spangled Banner. In addition, during the noon hour, the station airs "The 90s at Noon", a show that features country music from the 1990s.

The nationally syndicated "Taste of Country Nights" air weeknights on the station. The station also airs nationally syndicated radio shows like "The Crook And Chase Countdown."

The station airs news broadcasts from its sister station KTWO (AM). Weather forecasts are provided by Cheyenne, WY based Day Weather.

References

External links
Official Website
 Flash Stream, MP3 Stream
 

Country radio stations in the United States
WYY
Townsquare Media radio stations